Moat on the Ledge: Live at Broughton Castle, August '81 is a live folk rock album by Fairport Convention. The album was produced by Simon Nicol and Dave Pegg.

The album was recorded during an early reunion festival, held at Broughton Castle in August 1981, before that event finally settled in its current Cropredy venue. It features a reunion appearance by Richard Thompson and the first public performance in some years by Judy Dyble.

It was originally released in 1982 as Woodworm WR001 (the number appeared on the label but not the sleeve), it has had various reissues, most recently on the 2003 Talking Elephant CD TECD052.

Track listing 
Side 1
 "Walk Awhile" (Dave Swarbrick, Richard Thompson) – 4:08
 "Country Pie" (Bob Dylan) – 3:23
 "Rosie" (Swarbrick) – 4:15
 "Matty Groves" (Traditional, arrangement by Fairport Convention) – 9:30
Side 2
 "Both Sides Now" (Joni Mitchell) – 3:25
 "Poor Will and the Hangman" (Thompson, Swarbrick) – 5:37
 "The Brilliancy Medley" / "Cherokee Shuffle" (Trad., arr. Fairport) – 3:27
 "Woman or a Man" (Thompson) – 3:20
 "High School Confidential" (Jerry Lee Lewis, Ron Hargrave) – 4:20

Personnel 
 Dave Swarbrick – vocals, fiddle, mandolin
 Richard Thompson – vocals, electric guitar
 Simon Nicol – vocals, electric and acoustic guitars
 Dave Pegg – bass
 Dave Mattacks – drums
 Bruce Rowland – drums

Guest musicians
 Judy Dyble – vocals on "Both Sides Now"
 Ralph McTell – electric guitar on "High School Confidential"

References 

Fairport Convention live albums
1982 live albums